Macroglossum incredibile is a moth of the family Sphingidae.

References

incredibile
Moths described in 2006